Paranicomia is a genus of beetles in the family Cerambycidae, containing the following species:

 Paranicomia leucoma (Lacordaire, 1872)
 Paranicomia similis Breuning, 1964

References

Apomecynini